Dysprosium(III) chloride (DyCl3), also known as dysprosium trichloride, is a compound of dysprosium and chlorine.  It is a white to yellow solid which rapidly absorbs water on exposure to moist air to form a hexahydrate, DyCl3·6H2O.  Simple rapid heating of the hydrate causes partial hydrolysis to an oxychloride, DyOCl.

Preparation and reactions
DyCl3 is often prepared by the "ammonium chloride route", starting from either Dy2O3 or the hydrated chloride DyCl3·6H2O. These methods produce (NH4)2[DyCl5]:

10 NH4Cl  +  Dy2O3  →  2 (NH4)2[DyCl5]  +  6 NH3 + 3 H2O

DyCl3·6H2O + 2 NH4Cl → (NH4)2[DyCl5] + 6 H2O

The pentachloride decomposes thermally according to the following equation:
(NH4)2[DyCl5]   →   2 NH4Cl  +  DyCl3
The thermolysis reaction proceeds via the intermediacy of (NH4)[Dy2Cl7].

Treating Dy2O3 with aqueous HCl produces the hydrated chloride DyCl3·6H2O, which cannot be rendered anhydrous by heating. Instead one obtains an oxychloride:

DyCl3 + H2O → DyOCl + 2 HCl

Dysprosium(III) chloride is a moderately strong Lewis acid, which ranks as "hard" according to the HSAB concept.  Aqueous solutions of dysprosium chloride can be used to prepare other dysprosium(III) compounds, for example dysprosium(III) fluoride:

DyCl3  +  3 NaF →  DyF3  +  3 NaCl

Uses
Dysprosium(III) chloride can be used as a starting point for the preparation of other dysprosium salts.  Dysprosium metal is produced when a molten mixture of DyCl3 in eutectic LiCl-KCl is electrolysed.  The reduction occurs via Dy2+, at a tungsten cathode.

Precautions
Dysprosium compounds are believed to be of low to moderate toxicity, although their toxicity has not been investigated in detail.

References

Dysprosium compounds
Chlorides
Lanthanide halides